Alfred George Stannard (1827–1885) was an English painter of landscapes and a member of the Norwich School of painters.

Life
Alfred George Stannard, who was probably born in 1827, was christened on 15 July 1827 at St George's Church, Tombland, Norwich by Alfred Stannard and his wife Martha. Alfred Stannard was a water-colourist and Martha Sparkes was herself an amateur painter. They produced a family of fourteen children, which included the painter Eloise Harriet Stannard.

Alfred George studied under his father, exhibited works at the British Institution and used visits to Wales and Switzerland to broaden his outlook. he married the Norwich artist Anne Hodgson.

References

Bibliography

External links
Works by Alfred George Stannard in the Norfolk Museums Collections

1828 births
1885 deaths
19th-century English artists
British landscape artists
Artists from Norwich
Sibling artists